Ponta do Sinó is the southernmost point of the island of Sal in Cape Verde. It lies 2 km southwest of Santa Maria city centre. The area north of the headland is a protected area: nature reserve Ponta do Sinó, at the edge of a large tourism development zone. There is a lighthouse on the headland, Farol da Ponta do Sinó, built in 1892.

See also
Tourism in Cape Verde

References

Headlands of Cape Verde
Geography of Sal, Cape Verde
Protected areas of Cape Verde
Santa Maria, Cape Verde